SummitX Snowboarding is a snowboarding video game from Com2us developed by Free Range Games.

Gameplay

SummitX Snowboarding includes 3D terrain with 36 multi-branching runs on 6 mountains. Players choose between a male and female character. The characters perform tricks such as spins, flips, and rolls. Each trick earns the player a time bonus that allows the player more time to get to the bottom of the mountain. SummitX Snowboarding features HD quality graphics and realistic game physics.

References

External links
Com2uS website
Free Range Games website

2011 video games
Android (operating system) games
IOS games
Snowboarding video games
Video games developed in South Korea